Albert Charles "Al" Eisenberg (born October 15, 1946) is an American politician. He served in the Virginia House of Delegates 2004–2010, representing the 47th district in the Arlington County suburbs of Washington, D.C. Prior to that, he served on the Arlington County Board 1984–1999. Eisenberg is a member of the Democratic Party.

Eisenberg served on the House committees on Agriculture, Chesapeake and Natural Resources (2004–2009), General Laws (2008–2009), and Science and Technology (2004–2009).

Eisenberg's wife, Sharon E. Davis, was chief clerk/chief minority clerk of the United States House Committee on Energy and Commerce 1981–2011.

Electoral history

Notes

External links
 (campaign finance)

1946 births
Living people
Politicians from Jersey City, New Jersey
Jewish American state legislators in Virginia
Democratic Party members of the Virginia House of Delegates
University of Richmond alumni
Hampton University alumni
People from Arlington County, Virginia
21st-century American politicians
21st-century American Jews